Carlos Enrique Prono (born October 5, 1963 in Buenos Aires, Argentina) is a former Argentine footballer who played in clubs of Argentina, Chile, Colombia and Honduras.

Titles
 Unión Española 1992 and 1993 (Copa Chile)
 Olimpia 1996-97 Liga Nacional de Fútbol de Honduras
 Olimpia 1998-99 Liga Nacional de Fútbol de Honduras
 Olimpia 2000-01 Torneo Apertura

External links
 

1963 births
Living people
Argentine footballers
Argentine expatriate footballers
Argentina under-20 international footballers
Argentina international footballers
Association football goalkeepers
Chacarita Juniors footballers
Talleres de Córdoba footballers
Unión Española footballers
Deportes Quindío footballers
C.D. Olimpia players
C.D. Victoria players
Chilean Primera División players
Argentine Primera División players
Liga Nacional de Fútbol Profesional de Honduras players
Expatriate footballers in Chile
Expatriate footballers in Colombia
Expatriate footballers in Honduras
Footballers from Buenos Aires